Rick Ray (born May 8, 1970) is an American basketball coach. He was most recently the head basketball coach at Southeast Missouri State. He was previously the head coach at Mississippi State.

Ray was born in Compton, California; however, his family moved to Kansas City when Ray was 6 years old.  He is an All-American Scholar Athlete basketball player who played at Grand View College, where he majored in Applied Mathematics and Secondary Education.  After graduation, Ray worked as an actuary in Chicago, but soon realized that he wanted to be a basketball coach. He quit his actuary job and became a coach and teacher at a high school in Des Moines, Iowa. After  years, he left to become a graduate assistant coach at Nebraska-Omaha.  While at Nebraska-Omaha, he also earned a master's degree in Sports Administration.  From there, Ray was an assistant coach at Indiana State, Northern Illinois, Purdue, and Clemson, before being hired by Mississippi State.

Upon hiring Ray, Mississippi State Athletics Director Scott Stricklin said, “Rick fits the model of head coach we have sought to bring into our program over the last several years. He is bright, enthusiastic, disciplined and is a man of integrity. He has served with some of the top head and assistant coaches in college basketball and will bring a piece of all of them to our head coaching position.” 

On March 21, 2015 Ray was fired by Mississippi State. He was subsequently hired by Southeast Missouri State. After finishing the 2019-20 season with a 7-24 record, Ray was let go by Southeast Missouri State.

Head coaching record

References

External links
 Southeast Missouri State profile

1970 births
Living people
American men's basketball coaches
American men's basketball players
Basketball coaches from Missouri
Basketball players from Missouri
Clemson Tigers men's basketball coaches
Grand View Vikings men's basketball players
Indiana State Sycamores men's basketball coaches
Mississippi State Bulldogs men's basketball coaches
Northern Illinois Huskies men's basketball coaches
Purdue Boilermakers men's basketball coaches
Southeast Missouri State Redhawks men's basketball coaches